Creative Vault AB (formerly EPOS Game Studios) is an independent video game developer based in Gothenburg, Sweden. The company was founded by Staffan Langin and Olof Gustafsson in the summer of 2005 with the desire to develop games for multiple platforms. Its first game was Crash Commando (2005), an online shooter for the PlayStation 3. In 2012, Gustafsson left the company, which was renamed Creative Vault Studios. Under the guidance of Langin as sole CEO, the company has worked on several projects with Sony Interactive Entertainment, beginning with the virtual reality port for Hustle Kings in 2016. The following year, the studio collaborated with XDev and Clever Beans on Wipeout Omega Collection, a remaster of Wipeout HD, Wipeout HD Fury, and Wipeout 2048.

History 

EPOS Game Studios (originally named Motherlode Studios) was founded in the summer of 2005 by Staffan Langin and Olof Gustafsson, co-founders of Digital Illusions. The studio's goal was to create "cutting-edge titles for a variety of platforms". The studio's first game, Crash Commando, was released in December 2008. It is a shooter game with both single-player and multiplayer game modes, tasking players against each other or bots while traversing the environments. The game received "generally favorable reviews" according to review aggregator Metacritic, with an average score of 78 out of 100. Reviewers praised the game's level design and weapon diversity, but felt that the single-player campaign lacked the excitement of the multiplayer.

In December 2013, EPOS began working on a project with an international publisher. Gustafsson amicably left the company in the same month to work on game music, and Langin became the sole chief executive officer. The company was renamed Creative Vault Studios.

Creative Vault collaborated with Sony Interactive Entertainment to bring Hustle Kings to PlayStation VR for the PlayStation 4 in October 2016. The game received "mixed or average reviews" according to Metacritic, with an average score of 52 out of 100. It received praise for its immersion and similarity to the sport, but was criticized for its complicated control scheme.

The following year, Creative Vault collaborated with XDev and Clever Beans to develop Wipeout Omega Collection, which was released for PlayStation 4 in June 2017. The game is a remaster of Wipeout HD, Wipeout HD Fury, and Wipeout 2048, featuring higher textures, more effects, and shorter loading times. It received positive reviews, with an average score of 85 out of 100 from Metacritic. Critics praised its upgraded graphics and controls, particularly in comparison to the PlayStation Vita version of the collection.

The studio continued to work on a virtual reality version of the game, which was released for PlayStation VR through a free patch in March 2018. It received praise for its multiple options and suitability for virtual reality. Digital Foundrys Richard Leadbetter praised the technical achievements of Wipeout Omega Collection VR, calling it "a zero compromise, enhanced VR port of one of the very best remasters available for PlayStation 4".

Games developed

Notes

References

External links 

Privately held companies of Sweden
Video game companies established in 2005
Video game companies of Sweden